The 2002 Allianz Suisse Open Gstaad was a men's tennis tournament played on outdoor clay courts at the Roy Emerson Arena in Gstaad in Switzerland and was part of the International Series of the 2002 ATP Tour. It was the 57th edition of the tournament and was held from 8 July until 14 July 2002. Àlex Corretja won the singles title.

Finals

Singles

 Àlex Corretja defeated  Gastón Gaudio 6–3, 7–6(7–3), 7–6(7–3)
 It was Corretja's 1st title of the year and the 19th of his career.

Doubles

 Joshua Eagle /  David Rikl defeated  Massimo Bertolini /  Cristian Brandi 7–6(7–5), 6–4
 It was Eagle's 1st title of the year and the 3rd of his career. It was Rikl's 3rd title of the year and the 25th of his career.

External links
 Official website  
 Official website 
 Official website 
 ATP tournament profile

Allianz Suisse Open Gstaad
Swiss Open (tennis)
Allianz Suisse Open Gstaad
2002 Allianz Suisse Open Gstaad